Salvatore Cuoci (born January 26, 1965) is a member of the Italian Armed Forces, and the 22nd Commander of the Kosovo Force.

Cuoci has held several other commands within the Italian military, and other NATO led operations.

Early life
Cuoci was born in Aversa on the 26th of January, 1965. Before entering the military, he attended the Italian Military Academy in 1983.

Military career
In 1987, after graduating from the military academy, he attended the Junior Army Officers School, located in Turin. Post-graduation Cuoci was appointed as Lieutenant of Armoured troops in September 1987.

He then served as a platoon commander for the 9th Armoured Battalion, "M.O. Butera" in L’Aquila, in the 6th Tank Battalion "M.O. Scapuzzi”. When in Civitavecchia he served as company commander, S2 and S3 Chief.

Awards
Cuoci has received several awards from Italy, and other foreign nations.
Order of Merit of the Italian Republic
NATO Medal for Operation in former Yugoslavia
French commemorative medal
United Nations Medal for UNIFIL Peacekeeping Operation

References

Italian generals
People of the Kosovo War
Military personnel of the Bosnian War
Recipients of the Order of Merit of the Italian Republic
Recipients of the NATO Meritorious Service Medal
Living people
1965 births